Thomas or Tom Beynon may refer to:

Thomas Beynon (Archdeacon of Cardigan) (1744–1833), literary patron and Archdeacon of Cardigan
 Thomas Beynon (Independent minister) (died 1729), Welsh Independent minister from Pembrokeshire
Tom Beynon (Presbyterian minister) (1886–1961), Presbyterian minister, author, and historian from Carmarthenshire
Tom Beynon (Canadian football) (born c. 1941), Canadian football player

See also
Thomas Benyon (born 1942), British politician and activist